Windsor Castle was launched at Whitby in 1783. Initially she was primarily a West Indiaman. Then from 1797 she made five voyages as a slave ship and foundered off Bermuda in 1803 after having disembarked her slaves.

Career
Windsor Castle first appeared in Lloyd's Register (LR) in 1783 with G. Young, master, G. Tarbut, owner, and trade London–Jamaica.

From 1797 on Windsor Castle made five voyages as a slave ship based out of Liverpool.

Slave voyage #1 (1797–1798): Captain Thomas Jones acquired a letter of marque on 13 March 1797. He sailed from Liverpool on 10 April, bound for West Africa. Windsor Castle gathered her slaves first at New Calabar and then at Bonny. She arrived at Kingston Jamaica on 18 December. There she disembarked 435 slaves. She sailed from Kingston on 18 February 1798 and arrived back at Liverpool on 19 April. She had left with 39 crew members and had 11 crew deaths on the voyage.

Slave voyage #2 (1798–1799): Captain Jones sailed from Liverpool on 15 August 1798, bound for West Africa. Windsor Castle gathered her slaves at Calabar and Bonny, and arrived at Kingston on 72 May 1799. There she landed 420 slaves. She sailed form Kingston on 15 July and arrived back at Liverpool on 3 October. She had left with 50 crew members and had 18 crew deaths on the voyage.

Slave voyage #3 (1800–1801): Captain Jones sailed from Liverpool on 7 May 1800, bound for West Africa. Windsor Castle gathered her slaves at Calabar and delivered them to Suriname on 2 December. She sailed from Suriname on 1 February 1801 and arrived back at Liverpool on 20 April. She had left with 48 crew members and had nine crew deaths on the voyage.

Slave voyage #4 (1801–1802): Captain Gilbert Curry acquired a letter of marque on 8 July 1801. He sailed from Liverpool on 1 July 1801, bound for West Africa. Windsor Castle gathered her slaves at Calabar and delivered them to Trinidad, where she arrived on 10 February 1802. There she landed 280 slaves. She arrived back at Liverpool on 2 May 1802. She had left with 48 crew members and had four crew deaths on the voyage.

Slave voyage #5 (1802–1803): Captain John Bean sailed from Liverpool on 13 October 1802. Because he left during the Peace of Amiens, he did not acquire a letter of marque. It is not clear where Windsor Castle gathered her slaves, but she delivered them to Antigua and St Thomas. She arrived at St Thomas on 23 May 1803, and landed some 289 slaves. She had left Liverpool with 34 crew members and had nine crew deaths on the voyage.

Loss
Lloyd's List reported on 15 November 1803 that Windsor Castle, which had been sailing from St Thomas to Liverpool, had foundered off Bermuda. , Moon, master, had rescued the crew and taken them to Lancaster. Eliza arrived at Lancaster on 13 November.

Notes, citations, and references
Notes

Citations

References
  

1783 ships
Ships built in Whitby
Age of Sail merchant ships of England
Liverpool slave ships
Maritime incidents in 1803
Shipwrecks in the Atlantic Ocean